My Neighbour Totoro is a stage play based on Studio Ghibli's 1988 animated film of the same name by Hayao Miyazaki. It is adapted by Tom Morton-Smith with music by Joe Hisaishi.

Synopsis 
In 1950s Japan, two girls, Satsuki and Mei, whose mother has been hospitalised with tuberculosis, relocate to a village in the countryside. Their new house, in which they live with their professor father, Tatsuo, is haunted with soot spirits, and they encounter Totoro, a "forest spirit who looks like the result of an experimental breeding programme involving a chinchilla, a barn owl and a bean-bag sofa". Mei is the first to discover him, and he comforts the girls with his presence.

Cast and characters

Production history 
The film version was released in 1988, having been written by Hayao Miyazaki of Studio Ghibli.

The play is directed by Phelim McDermott, produced and composed by Joe Hisaishi and the Royal Shakespeare Company, in collaboration with Improbable and Nippon TV. The production was done with Miyazaki's blessing, on the condition that Hisaishi was doing it; Hisaishi had wanted to see an original Japanese show be performed internationally. Tom Morton-Smith adapted the play from the movie and had begun work on the stage adaptation for years prior to the Royal Shakespeare Company's April 2022 announcement that it was being staged. He spoke of the difficulties converting it from film due to its structure, saying that the movie contradicted "everything [he] thought [he] knew about dramatic structure and that he saw his job as "translation as well as adaptation". Reviewers comparing the movie and the play have noted that the adaptation has more speaking and greater development of supporting characters, with more emphasis on the interactions between people. They have also written of the length, pointing out that it is nearly an hour longer than the original.

According to Morton-Smith, rehearsals began without the script, with it only being taken into the rehearsal room on the second week. Casting of the children were done using adult actors, with Johnny Oleksinski writing in the New York Post that he believed it was due to the need to create Miyazaki's effect of "anime-style young people": child actors would not have been able to capture the same nuances in character. However, Nick Curtis of the Evening Standard wrote that it meant that the "tropes of child acting [were] thoroughly overworked". Furuhata's portrayal of Kanta received mixed reviews, with Oleksinski calling his performance "tender" and hilarious and Quentin Letts of The Sunday Times writing it was "delightful [and] quirky"; Curtis said that it was a "parody of awkwardness".

The play makes extensive use of puppets, with puppetmaster Basil Twist saying that "Totoro must be that you want to touch him, that you want to fall asleep on his belly". In particular, the Japanese producers strongly advocated for the use of human puppeteers instead of machines: the product was a new "wind spirit" style of puppetry. Prototypes were created in San Francisco by Twist, who brought them to London for further work with consultants and McDermott. The prototypes were then sent to Los Angeles for detailed crafting of the small parts and materials.

The set was created out of steel base, with an oak veneer, and used  to treat some of the house's wood surfaces. Saying that "there's nothing less Japanese" than having plastic leaves to represent the forest, production designer Tom Pye used wood liberally, using two-dimensional layers instead of using three-dimensional props.

On 19 May 2022, the production broke the Barbican's box-office record for ticket sales in one day, previously held by the 2015 production of Hamlet starring Benedict Cumberbatch. It premiered at the Barbican Centre, London, from 8 October, with an official press night on 18 October and running until 21 January 2023.

Themes 
My Neighbour Totoro focuses on the illness of loved ones, love of the environment and fear, with Tom Pye stating that the story had become more relevant due to COVID-19 prevention measures and global warming. Mei Mac, who played Mei, agreed with Pye's assessment of the pandemic's effect and said, "At its heart, Totoro is about grief, and these two girls who are missing their sick mother."

Critical reception 
While criticising the pace of the play due to how closely it mirrored the movie, Sarah Hemming of the Financial Times gave it five stars, praising the portrayal of the main characters and called the play a "gorgeous, uplifting tribute to the link between theatre and the imaginative realm of children's play". The Daily Telegraph Dominic Cavendish also observed that the pace was due to the film, but called it "intoxicating [and] detail-savouring". Awarding it four stars, he compared it to a pantomime but ultimately praised it as a "vital power surge of Anglo-Japanese creative electricity fit for these soul-sapped times".

In a five-star review in The Guardian, Arifa Akbar compared the play to the movie, writing that there was a "different imagination at work here, but it is just as enchanting and perhaps more emotionally impactful". She highlighted the puppeteers' role, calling them a "human field of corn, swaying as one" and describing Totoro as "formidable, rumbling, eerie, comic and endearing at once". Also praising their role was its sister paper's Susannah Clapp, praising them in a four-star review as the "souls of the creatures and the real pulse of the play". Identically giving it four stars, Johnny Oleksinski of the New York Post called for the play to be shown on Broadway, saying that it "balances jaw-dropping effects with soul and emotional intelligence" and it played host to "one of the most stunning theatrical images in years". 

Cautioning that watching Totoro would lead to "sore cheeks" from the "two and a half hours you'll spend grinning from ear to ear", The Independent Annabel Nugent gave it four stars; she likened the set's ability to adapt to origami but said that the music was occasionally not a strong enough partner to the "splendour of the visual storytelling". Writing in The Times, Clive Davis also picked out the music for criticism in a four-star review, attacking it as "so insipid" but praising the protagonists' portrayal, puppeteers, and set.

Giving it four stars in its Sunday edition, Quentin Letts called it "likeably impassive [and] lightly surreal". He said that its lack of evil was a double-edged sword, but admitted that the play would probably be a good fit for children. Likewise focusing on the light nature was Nick Curtis of the Evening Standard, who stated in a three-star review that Totoro needed "more jeopardy, more darkness and more of the monsters". Comparing Totoro to another play, Matilda, that he believed the Royal Shakespeare Company were trying to emulate, he said it was not "quirky or adult-friendly enough" to be the same, saying that it was "easier to admire than to love". Also making a comparison between the two plays was Matt Wolf of The New York Times, who said that they were "family entertainment that adults might like even more than children". While criticising the quick changes in tone for the ending as the play's one error, Wolf called the "kindness, empathy and generosity of spirit" "infectious".

On 8 December 2022, it was announced that My Neighbour Totoro led the nominations for the 2023 WhatsOnStage Awards, earning nine nominations. My Neighbour Totoro came fifth on The Independent's best theatre of 2022 ranking.

Awards

Original production

References

External links 
 Official website (RSC)

2022 plays
British plays
Plays about families
Plays based on films
Plays set in Japan
Plays set in the 1950s
Studio Ghibli
Works by Joe Hisaishi